Domagoj Bradarić (born 10 December 1999) is a Croatian professional footballer who plays for Italian  club Salernitana and the Croatia national team as a left-back.

Club career

Hajduk Split
Born in Split, Bradarić joined the youth setup of Hajduk Split in 2007. Ahead of the 2017–18 season, he was promoted to the reserves.

On 18 June 2018, Bradarić was promoted to the senior team and signed his first professional contract. On 15 September, he made his first team debut, coming on as a substitute for Steliano Filip in a 3–1 victory against Rudeš. After playing the next six matches, he injured himself, only to return to play against Rudeš in December, and providing an assist to Jairo de Macedo da Silva. At the end of the season, his inaugural in the first team at Hajduk, Bradarić was named in the team of the season.

He made his final appearance for Hajduk on 9 July 2019 in a Europa League qualifying away 2–0 victory over Gżira United.

Lille

On 19 July, Bradarić signed a five-year deal with Lille OSC. The transfer fee between the two sides was reported as €6.5 million plus €2 million in potential bonuses and 10% of a future transfer fee. He made his league debut in a 2–1 home victory over Nantes on 18 August. He made his Champions League debut on 17 September in a 3–0 away defeat to Ajax.

On 21 February 2021, Bradarić scored his debut goal for Lille in a 4–1 victory over Lorient.

Salernitana
On 15 July 2022, Bradarić signed a four-year contract with Salernitana in Italy.

International career
On 5 November 2018, Bradarić was called up to the Croatian under-21 national team for a friendly match against France. On 7 June 2019, he was named in Nenad Gračan's 23-man squad for UEFA Under-21 Euro 2019, where he made two appearances as Croatia finished at the bottom of the group.

On 21 September 2020, senior team coach Zlatko Dalić called Bradarić up for October fixtures against Switzerland, Sweden and France. On 7 October, he made his national team debut in a friendly 2–1 victory over Switzerland. Despite being a full-back, Bradarić started as a winger in his debut and provided Josip Brekalo with an assist for Croatia's equalizer.

On 9 March 2021, he was named in Igor Bišćan's 23-man squad for the group stage of UEFA Under-21 Euro 2021. He played every minute of the group stage and scored an injury time goal in the final game, the 2–1 defeat to England, which turned out to be decisive as Croatia progressed to the knockout phase due to a better goal difference. On 17 May, he was named in Bišćan's 23-man squad for the knockout stage of the tournament, as well as Dalić's 26-man squad for UEFA Euro 2020. However, he got no playing time at the latter tournament, being behind Joško Gvardiol and Borna Barišić in the pecking order.

Personal life
Bradarić's parents are divorced. His father Ante Bradarić hails from Kotlenica near Dugopolje, but lives in Germany. His mother Natalija Tabak is a Bosnian Croat from Eminovo Selo near Tomislavgrad, but lives in Strožanac near Podstrana with Bradarić's younger brother Luka. She also works as Bradarić's agent.

He listed Marcelo and Jordi Alba as his football role models.

Career statistics

Club

International

Honours
Lille
Ligue 1: 2020–21
Trophée des Champions: 2021

References

External links

Domagoj Bradarić at Hajduk Split's website

1999 births
Footballers from Split, Croatia
Living people
Association football defenders
Croatian footballers
Croatian Football League players
First Football League (Croatia) players
HNK Hajduk Split players
Croatia youth international footballers
Croatia under-21 international footballers
Croatia international footballers
Lille OSC players
U.S. Salernitana 1919 players
Ligue 1 players
UEFA Euro 2020 players
Croatian expatriate sportspeople in France
Expatriate footballers in France
Croatian expatriate sportspeople in Italy
Expatriate footballers in Italy